Biadaszki may refer to the following places:
Biadaszki, Kępno County in Greater Poland Voivodeship (west-central Poland)
Biadaszki, Ostrów Wielkopolski County in Greater Poland Voivodeship (west-central Poland)
Biadaszki, Łódź Voivodeship (central Poland)